Wrestling Australia (formerly known as the Australian Wrestling Union) is the organization that currently governs Beach wrestling, Freestyle wrestling, and Greco-Roman wrestling for Men and Women in Australia. Wrestling Australia is also the official representative to the Australian Olympic Committee (AOC) and to United World Wrestling (UWW) and is the national governing body of the sport.

Structure
Wrestling Australia is affiliated to the Oceanian Council of Associated Wrestling (COLA) and United World Wrestling and is recognised by the Australian Olympic Committee (AOC).

The national body has six state member associations:
 Wrestling ACT
 Wrestling NSW
 Wrestling Queensland
 Wrestling SA
 Wrestling Victoria
 Wrestling WA

The main tournament they organise is the annual Australian National Wrestling Championships and the Australian Youth National Championships.

Wrestling Australia is a full member sport of the Combat Institute of Australia (CombatAUS).

See also

Amateur wrestling in Australia

References

External links 

 

Sports governing bodies in Australia
Wrestling in Australia
National members of United World Wrestling